Rúben Alexandre Rocha Lima (born 3 October 1989) is a Portuguese professional footballer who plays for F.C. Famalicão mainly as a left-back.

Club career

Portugal
A product of hometown S.L. Benfica's youth system, Lisbon-born Lima was promoted to the first team for the 2007–08 season. In January 2008 however he, alongside teammates Miguel Vítor and Romeu Ribeiro, was loaned to C.D. Aves in the Segunda Liga, with the move being extended for the entirety of the following campaign.

Lima moved to Vitória de Setúbal for 2009–10, also on loan. He made his Primeira Liga debut on 17 August 2009, playing the full 90 minutes in a 0–0 home draw against Vitória de Guimarães. He eventually appeared in 24 of the league's 30 games (22 starts), as the Sadinos barely avoided relegation.

After his contract with Benfica ended, Lima signed for S.C. Beira-Mar, recently returned to the top division.

Hajduk Split
In June 2011, Lima moved abroad for the first time in his career, joining HNK Hajduk Split in the Croatian First Football League. He quickly became first-choice left-back at his new club, as that position had lacked in consistency ever since the departure of Ivan Strinić to FC Dnipro Dnipropetrovsk.

Under the management of Krasimir Balakov, Lima was a first-team regular in the 2011–12 season. He made his debut in the UEFA Europa League on 28 July 2011, playing the full 90 minutes in a 1–0 away loss to Stoke City in the third qualifying round.

Dinamo Zagreb
On 24 July 2013, Lima signed a four-year contract with Hajduk Split's fierce rivals, GNK Dinamo Zagreb, for an undisclosed fee.

Club statistics

Honours
Hajduk Split
Croatian Football Cup: 2012–13

Dinamo Zagreb
Croatian First Football League: 2013–14

References

External links

1989 births
Living people
Portuguese footballers
Footballers from Lisbon
Association football defenders
Primeira Liga players
Liga Portugal 2 players
S.L. Benfica footballers
C.D. Aves players
Vitória F.C. players
S.C. Beira-Mar players
C.F. União players
Moreirense F.C. players
Belenenses SAD players
F.C. Famalicão players
Croatian Football League players
HNK Hajduk Split players
GNK Dinamo Zagreb players
HNK Rijeka players
HNK Rijeka II players
Portugal youth international footballers
Portugal under-21 international footballers
Portuguese expatriate footballers
Expatriate footballers in Croatia
Portuguese expatriate sportspeople in Croatia